The 2016 Texas A&M Aggies football team represented Texas A&M University in the 2016 NCAA Division I FBS football season. The Aggies played their home games at Kyle Field in College Station, Texas and competed in the Western Division of the Southeastern Conference (SEC). They were led by fifth-year head coach Kevin Sumlin. They finished the season 8–5, 4–4 in SEC play to finish in fourth place in the Western Division. They were invited to the Texas Bowl where they lost to Kansas State.

Preseason

Recruiting class
In the 2016 recruiting class, Texas A&M signed 21 players (22 including transfer QB Trevor Knight), 8 of which were included in the ESPN 300 and 8 in the 247 Sports top 250. The class was ranked 20th in the nation by ESPN, 17th by Rivals, 18th by 247, and 20th by Scout.

Personnel

Roster

Schedule
Texas A&M announced its 2016 football schedule on October 29, 2015. The 2016 schedule consists of 7 home games, 4 away games and 1 neutral site game in the regular season. The Aggies will host SEC foes LSU, Ole Miss, and Tennessee, and will travel to Alabama, Auburn, Mississippi State, and South Carolina. Texas A&M will go against Arkansas for the third time in a row in Arlington, Texas.

The Aggies will host all four of its non–conference games which are against New Mexico State Aggies from the Sun Belt Conference, Prairie View A&M Panthers from the Southwestern Athletic Conference, UCLA Bruins from the Pac-12 Conference and UTSA Roadrunners from Conference USA.

Schedule Source:

Coaching staff

Game summaries

UCLA

The Texas A&M Aggies opened their 2016 season at home against the #16 UCLA Bruins. The Aggies dominated the Bruins in the first 3 quarters of the game, leading 24–9 at the start of the 4th quarter. UCLA started a comeback late in the 4th quarter with Bolu Olorunfunmi running 9 yards for a touchdown. With J.J. Molson making the extra point, the Bruins trailed 16–24 with 4:19 left in regulation. UCLA's defense forced the Aggies into a 3–and–out on the next possession. The Bruins' offense wasted no time scoring again, with Josh Rosen throwing 62 yards to Kenneth Walker III to trail 22–24. UCLA tied it up 24–24 with Rosen finding Austin Roberts for the two–point conversion with 2:39 left in regulation. A&M punted on their next possession, but gained the ball back after a Rosen pass was intercepted by Justin Evans at the A&M 47 yard line. The 4th quarter ended with the Aggies marching down to the UCLA 40 before turning it over on downs.

The Aggies received the ball first to start overtime and found the end zone with a 1 yard touchdown run from Trevor Knight. UCLA made it to the A&M 5, but failed to score on a 4th and goal, ending the game. Winning the game in overtime, the Texas A&M Aggies upset the #16 UCLA Bruins 31–24.

Prairie View A&M

After the upset the week before against the #16 UCLA Bruins, the #20 Texas A&M Aggies hosted the FCS Prairie View A&M Panthers from the SWAC. The Aggies' defense held the Panthers scoreless, only allowed 10 first downs, 205 total yards of offense, and forcing a safety. A&M's special teams were also a highlight, with Justin Evans blocking a 38 yard field goal in the 1st quarter and Nick Harvey returning a punt 73 yards for a touchdown in the 4th. The only highlights for the Panthers was Raleigh Johnson intercepting a Trevor Knight pass in the end zone in the 2nd quarter and Johnson forcing a fumble that was recovered by Reginald Stubblefield late in the 4th.

Auburn

The Aggies opened 2016 conference play on the road against the Auburn Tigers. Texas A&M kicker Daniel LaCamera made 5 goals during the game while quarterback Trevor Knight didn't throw an interception during the game, the first game of the season where he didn't throw a pick.

Arkansas

South Carolina

Tennessee

Alabama

New Mexico State

Mississippi State

Ole Miss

UTSA

LSU

Kansas State (Advocare V100 Texas Bowl)

Rankings

13

References

Texas AandM
Texas A&M Aggies football seasons
Texas AandM Aggies football